The Child Garden is a 1989 science fiction novel by Canadian writer Geoff Ryman. It won both the Arthur C. Clarke Award and the John W. Campbell Memorial Award in 1990.

The novel is structured as two books with a brief introduction. The first book was originally published in two parts as "Love Sickness" in the Summer and Autumn 1987 editions of the British science fiction magazine Interzone.  It won the 1988 BFSA Award and placed 8th in the Locus Poll Award for Best Novella.

Synopsis 
In a future semitropical England cancer has been cured, but, as a result, the human lifespan has been halved and socialism has replaced capitalism. It is a world transformed by global warming and by advances in genetic engineering. Houses, machines, even spaceships are genetically-engineered life-forms.

Milena, an actress, secretly has an immunity to the viruses routinely used to educate people. She attempts to use holograms to stage an opera based on Dante's The Divine Comedy. The opera is written by her genetically modified friend Rolfa. As she works on the opera she encounters the ruling body of the world, called the Consensus, an artificial hive mind made up of the mental patterns of billions of children. Milena slowly discovers that this gestalt consciousness is lonely and afraid of dying and it looks to Milena as a form of salvation.

See also

Geoff Ryman bibliography

References

External links
 The Child Garden at Worlds Without End

1989 British novels
1989 science fiction novels
John W. Campbell Award for Best Science Fiction Novel-winning works
Novels by Geoff Ryman
Works originally published in Interzone (magazine)
Allen & Unwin books